Ognon may refer to:

Rivers in France
 Ognon (Franche-Comté) in Franche-Comté, tributary of the Saône
 Ognon (Loire-Atlantique) in Loire-Atlantique
 Ognon, which becomes the Ornain after its confluence with the Maldite

Others
 Ognon, Oise, commune in France
 "Oignon" and (since the 1990 orthographic reform) "ognon" are the French language words for onion.